Hysteronaevia is a genus of fungi in the family Dermateaceae. The genus contains 11 species.

Species
Hysteronaevia advena
Hysteronaevia cincturata
Hysteronaevia clavulifera
Hysteronaevia fimbriata
Hysteronaevia holoschoeni
Hysteronaevia kobayasii
Hysteronaevia luzulicola
Hysteronaevia minutissima
Hysteronaevia olivacea
Hysteronaevia scirpina
Hysteronaevia stenospora

See also 

 List of Dermateaceae genera

References

External links 

 Hysteronaevia at Index Fungorum

Dermateaceae genera